The 2018–19 Top 14 competition was the 120th season of the French domestic rugby union club competition operated by the Ligue Nationale de Rugby (LNR). Two new teams from the 2017–18 Pro D2 season were promoted to Top 14 (Perpignan and Grenoble) in place of the two relegated teams, Oyonnax and Brive.

On 27 April 2019, Perpignan were relegated after they lost at home to La Rochelle, condemning the newly promoted side to the drop with three games still to play.  It was a truly dreadful season for Perpignan and one of the worst ever by a club in the history of the Top 14 - at one point it even looked like they might go through the whole season without a win but mercifully they finally achieved a victory on 16 February 2019 against Montpellier.  They will be joined in 2018–19 Rugby Pro D2 by Grenoble, who lost the relegation playoff game, 22-28, to Brive.  Brive and Rugby Pro D2 champions, Bayonne, will play in the 2019–20 Top 14.

The Top 14 final was contested between the top two teams in the league stage – Toulouse (1st) and Clermont (2nd) – who both won their semi-finals with relative ease.  In the end it was Toulouse who triumphed at the Stade de France, seeing out a 24-18 victory to win its 20th title and the clubs first since 2012.  It was a well deserved victory for Le Stade, who were head and shoulders the best team in the league, finishing 15 points clear of Clermont and beating them twice out of three meetings (the other result was a draw).  Despite missing out on the title, it was a still excellent season for Clermont, who massively improved on 2017-18 when they finished 9th, and also won the 2018–19 European Rugby Challenge Cup.

In terms of attendances, the Top 14 once again proved to be the most popular rugby union league in the world, with over 2.7 million supporters watching games that season.  This was an average of 14,624 per game, slightly higher than the second best supported league - the 2018–19 English Premiership - which had an average of 14,507.

Teams

Number of teams by regions

Competition format
The top six teams at the end of the regular season (after all the teams played one another twice, once at home, once away) enter a knockout stage to decide the Champions of France.  This consists of three rounds: the teams finishing third to sixth in the table play quarter-finals (hosted by the third and fourth placed teams). The winners then face the top two teams in the semi-finals, with the winners meeting in the final at the Stade de France in Saint-Denis.

The LNR uses a slightly different bonus points system from that used in most other rugby competitions. It trialled a new system in 2007–08 explicitly designed to prevent a losing team from earning more than one bonus point in a match, a system that also made it impossible for either team to earn a bonus point in a drawn match. LNR chose to continue with this system for subsequent seasons.

France's bonus point system operates as follows:

 4 points for a win.
 2 points for a draw.
 1 bonus point for winning while scoring at least 3 more tries than the opponent. This replaces the standard bonus point for scoring 4 tries regardless of the match result.
 1 bonus point for losing by 5 points (or fewer). The margin had been 7 points until being changed prior to the 2014–15 season.

Table

Relegation
Starting from the 2017–18 season forward, only the 14th placed team will be automatically relegated to Pro D2. The 13th placed team will face the runner-up of the Pro D2 play-off, with the winner of that play-off taking up the final place in Top 14 for the following season.

Fixtures & Results

Round 1

Round 2

Round 3

Round 4

Round 5

Round 6

Round 7

Round 8

Round 9

Round 10

Round 11

Round 12

Round 13

Round 14

Round 15

Round 16

Round 17

Round 18

Round 19

Round 20

Round 21

Round 22

Round 23

Perpignan are relegated.

Round 24

Round 25

Round 26

Relegation playoff
The team finishing in 13th place faces the runner-up of the Pro D2, with the winner of this match playing in the 2019–20 Top 14 and the loser in the 2019–20 Pro D2.

Playoffs

Semi-final Qualifiers

Semi-finals

Final

Leading scorers
Note: Flags to the left of player names indicate national team as has been defined under World Rugby eligibility rules, or primary nationality for players who have not yet earned international senior caps. Players may hold one or more non-WR nationalities.

Top points scorers

Top try scorers

Attendances

 Attendances do not include the semi-finals or final as these are at neutral venues.

See also
 2018–19 Rugby Pro D2 season

Notes

References

 
Top 14 seasons
 
France